Kazuyoshi Shigenobu (born August 20, 1999) is an American professional soccer player who plays as a midfielder for New York Red Bulls II in the United Soccer League.

Career
Shigenobu is a product of the academy of the New York Red Bulls. He was eventually called-up to the reserve side New York Red Bulls II and made his debut in the United Soccer League on August 12, 2016 against Orlando City B. He came on in the 69th minute for Vincent Bezecourt as Red Bulls II won 5–1.

Career statistics

References

External links 
 

1999 births
Living people
American soccer players
New York Red Bulls II players
Association football midfielders
Soccer players from New Jersey
USL Championship players
Princeton Tigers men's soccer players